Stefan Hager (born 25 January 1995) is an Austrian footballer who plays for Wacker Innsbruck.

Career

WSG Tirol
On 12 June 2019, Hager joined WSG Swarovski Tirol on a three-year contract.

Wacker Innsbruck
On 22 July 2021, he signed a one-year contract with Wacker Innsbruck.

References

External links

 
 

1995 births
Living people
Austrian footballers
Austria youth international footballers
Association football defenders
LASK players
FC Juniors OÖ players
SC Wiener Neustadt players
WSG Tirol players
FC Wacker Innsbruck (2002) players
Austrian Football Bundesliga players
2. Liga (Austria) players
Austrian Regionalliga players
Austrian expatriate footballers
Expatriate footballers in Germany
FC Bayern Munich footballers
Austrian expatriate sportspeople in Germany